Andrew McArthur (born 8 May 1979) is a Scottish professional golfer.

McArthur was born in Lanark. He turned professional in 2005 after a successful amateur career. He qualified for the second tier Challenge Tour by reaching the final stage of qualifying school. He narrowly missed out on graduating to the elite European Tour three times by ending the 2006, 2007 and 2008 seasons just outside the top 20 on the Challenge Tour Rankings. He finally gained his European Tour card for 2010 by finishing in 17th place on the rankings in 2009.

McArthur has two wins on the Challenge Tour: the Reale Challenge de España in 2008 and the D+D Real Slovakia Challenge in 2014.

Amateur wins
2002 Scottish Amateur Championship
2003 NCAA Division II Championship
2005 Czech Amateur Open Championship

Professional wins (4)

Challenge Tour wins (2)

Challenge Tour playoff record (0–1)

Hi5 Pro Tour wins (1)

Other wins (1)
2011 Paul Lawrie Invitational

Team appearances

Amateur
European Amateur Team Championship (representing Scotland): 2003, 2005
St Andrews Trophy (representing Great Britain & Ireland): 2004 (winners)

See also
2009 Challenge Tour graduates
2015 Challenge Tour graduates

References

External links

Scottish male golfers
European Tour golfers
Pfeiffer University alumni
Sportspeople from Lanark
Golfers from Glasgow
1979 births
Living people